The Vision of Indonesia 2045 (in Indonesian: Visi Indonesia 2045 or Wawasan Indonesia 2045) is an Indonesian ideal that set the goal for the country to be a sovereign, advanced, fair and prosperous nation by its centennial in 2045. The goal is set in 2045, since by then the republic will commemorate 100 years of its independence. The vision was formulated by Ministry of National Development Planning of Indonesia and was launched by Indonesian 7th president Joko Widodo on 9 May 2019. The President is optimistic that Indonesia will become the world’s fourth or fifth largest economy by 2045.

President Joko Widodo reiterated the vision once again during his second term inauguration speech on 20 October 2019, in which he envision that Indonesia will become a developed country, to rise among the world's top five largest economies by 2045.

History and development 

The shared national vision—that in the future Indonesia will transitioned from a modest agriculture and raw commodity-based developing country into an advanced industrial, service and technology-based developed nation—has been contemplated for generations. During Suharto's New Order administration around 1970s to mid 1990s, the planning took form as Garis-garis Besar Haluan Negara (GBHN) or outlines of state's policy, aimed for Lepas Landas or "take-off" as the country gradually transformed into a new industrialised country. However, the 1997 Asian financial crisis hit Indonesia hard, which caused the economic contraction and crippled the development. Subsequently, the crisis sparked the unrest and reformation movement that led to the fall of Suharto regime.

Several years following the turn of 21st century, Indonesian economy has been recovered, and the rising trends of economic growth and development continues. After 10 years, Indonesia has succeed weather the storm, transformed itself from a chaotic almost-failed state in 1998, into a thriving democratic society, also one of the strongest economy in Asia by 2007. This has led to a more optimistic outlook regarding Indonesian future. In 2009 Indonesia was admitted as a member of G-20 among world's major economies, thus become a sole representative of Southeast Asian region.

In June 2013, in his speech in Bali, President Susilo Bambang Yudhoyono expressed his high hopes; that in the 100th Anniversary of the Republic of Indonesia, the nation would rise to become a developed country in terms of economic, political, and social aspects, and also exercise considerable international influence in the region. He said; "I have a vision and a dream that in 2045 our economy will be truly strong and just, our democracy will mature, and our civilisation will flourish."

Moreover, Indonesia is predicted will enjoy demographic bonus between 2030 and 2040, that will boosts Indonesian development towards vision 2045 as a developed nation. By that time, the number of workforce or the population of productive age (aged 15–64 years old) is greater than the population of non productive age (aged at under 15 years and above 64 years old). During this period, the population of productive age is predicted to reach 64 percent of the total projected Indonesian population of 297 million.

On 30 December 2015 in Merauke, President Joko Widodo wrote his vision titled "Indonesian Dream 2015-2085". In his notebook he wrote seven dreams of lofty goals for Indonesian future, they are:
 Indonesian human resources whose intelligence outperforms other nations in the world
 Indonesian people who uphold pluralism, cultured, religious, and uphold ethical values
 Indonesia is the center of education, technology and world civilisation
 Society and government apparatus are free from corruption
 Equitable infrastructure development throughout Indonesia
 Indonesia is an independent and free country and one of the most influential in the Asia Pacific
 Indonesia is a benchmark (example) of world economic growth

On 2017, the Ministry of National Development Planning of Indonesia (Kementerian PPN-Bappenas) has finished formulating the vision. The vision was officially launched by President Joko Widodo on 9 May 2019. In this vision, the government set a target for Indonesia in 2045 to become the fifth largest economy in the world with a GDP of US$7.3 trillion and per capita income reaching US$25,000.

President Joko Widodo reiterate the vision once again during his second term inauguration speech in DPR/MPR Building on 20 October 2019. To achieve these goals, Joko Widodo has set 5 policies that he would implement during his second term administration between 2019-2024:
 Continuing the infrastructure development
 Developing human resource 
 Inviting investments to the maximum extent
 Reforming bureaucracy 
 Ensuring that the state budgets spending are focused and better-targeted

Four pillars of vision 2045 

The vision 2045 is built upon four pillars in accordance to Pancasila and National Constitution of 1945, these pillars are:
 Human development and the mastery of science and technology
 Sustainable economic development
 Equitable development
 Strengthening national resilience and governance

The four goals of these pillars in accordance to the preamble of the national constitution are:
 Protect all Indonesian citizen and all its people
 Promotes general welfare
 Enlighten the national life
 Implement world order based on liberty, eternal peace and social justice

See also 
 Wawasan Nusantara
 Economy of Indonesia
 Demographics of Indonesia

Notes

References

External links 
Visi Indonesia 2045
4 pillars of Indonesia Vision 2045
Jokowi’s full 2019 inauguration speech
Visi Indonesia 2045 by Bappenas RI on Youtube
CNA report on Jokowi's Indonesia Vision 2045 on Youtube

Economy of Indonesia
2019 in Indonesia
2045 in Indonesia
Indonesia
Politics of Indonesia